The 2012–13 Hazfi Cup was the 26th season of the Iranian football knockout competition. Esteghlal was the defending champion, but was eliminated by Sepahan in semi-final. The competition started on 13 December 2012 and was ended on 5 May 2013. Sepahan won the title after defeating Persepolis in final.

Participating teams
The following 32 teams compete in the Hazfi Cup 2012–13.

 Aboomoslem
 Aluminium
 Bargh Shiraz
 Damash Gilan
 Esteghlal TH
 Esteghlal Ahvaz
 Fajr Sepasi
 Foolad
 Gahar Zagros
 Hafari
 Malavan
 Mes Kerman
 Mes Rafsanjan
 Mes Sarcheshmeh
 Naft Tehran
 Naft Masjed Soleyman
 Niroye Zamini
 Parseh Iranian
 Paykan
 Persepolis
 Rah Ahan
 Saba Qom
 Saipa
 Saipa Shomal
 Sanat Naft Abadan
 Sang Ahan
 Sepahan
 Shahin Bushehr
 Shahrdari Tabriz
 Shahrdari Yasuj
 Tractor Sazi
 Zob Ahan

Results

Round of 32

Round of 16

Quarter-final

Semi-final

Final

Bracket 

Note:     H: Home team,   A: Away team

Goal scorers
5 goals
  Mohammad Nouri (Persepolis)

4 goals

  Farzad Hatami (Esteghlal)
  Karim Ansarifard (Persepolis)

3 goals

  Behnam Barzay (Sanat Naft)
  Hadi Norouzi (Persepolis)

2 goals

  Milad Jafari (Shahrdari Yasuj)
  Mohammad Reza Khalatbari (Sepahan)
  Xhevahir Sukaj (Sepahan)
  Mohammad Gholami (Sepahan)
  Amin Torkashvand (Gahar Zagros)
  Arash Borhani (Esteghlal)

1 goals

  Ervin Bulku (Sepahan)
  Farshid Talebi (Sepahan)
  Luciano Pereira (Foolad)
  Mohammad Pourmand (Shahrdari Yasuj)
  Mostafa Cheraghi (Shahrdari Yasuj)
  Reza Enayati (Mes Kerman)
  Reza Khaleghifar (Sanat Naft)
  Rasoul Navidkia (Sanat Naft)
  Rouhollah Arab (Sanat Naft)
  Ali Salmani Moghadam (Niroye Zamini)
  Reza Jaberi (Esteghlal Ahvaz)
  Amir Sharafi (Esteghlal Ahvaz)
  Taghi Nayebi (Gahar Zagros)
  Alireza Jahanbakhsh (Damash Gilan)
  Morteza Ebrahimi (Damash Gilan)
  Boubacar Kébé (Damash Gilan)
  Mohammad Reza Mahdavi (Damash Gilan)
  Amin Motevaselzadeh (Damash Gilan)
  Mohsen Azarpad (Aboomoslem)
  Farzad Hamidi (Aboomoslem)
  Younes Shakeri (Aboomoslem)
  Amir Hossein Ipakchi (Parseh)
  Mehdi Rajabzadeh (Zob Ahan)
  Esmaeil Farhadi (Zob Ahan)
  Vicente Arze (Esteghlal)
  Iman Mousavi (Esteghlal)
  Jlloyd Samuel (Esteghlal)
  Javad Nekounam (Esteghlal)
  Pejman Montazeri (Esteghlal)
  Gholamreza Rezaei (Persepolis)
  Hossein Mahini (Persepolis)
  Mohammad Hassan Rajabzadeh (Rah Ahan)
  Hossein Pashaei (Rah Ahan)
  Mehdi Nazari (Fajr Sepasi)
  Mehdi Seyed Salehi (Tractor Sazi)
  Mojtaba Norouzi (Saipa Shomal)
  Masoud Haghjou (Saba Qom)
  Amin Manouchehri (Naft Tehran)

Own goals

  Diego Máximo (Paykan), Scored for Aboomoslem (1)
  Mojtaba Torshizi (Mes Sarcheshmeh), Scored for Saipa Shomal (1)

See also 
 2012–13 Persian Gulf Cup
 2012–13 Azadegan League
 2012–13 Iran Football's 2nd Division
 2012–13 Iran Football's 3rd Division
 Iranian Super Cup
 2012–13 Iranian Futsal Super League

References

Hazfi Cup seasons
Hazfi Cup
Hazfi Cup